is a town located in Fukui Prefecture, Japan. ,  the town had an estimated population of 10,745 in 3,470 households and a population density of 31 persons per km².

Geography
Minamiechizen is located in central Fukui Prefecture, bordered by Gifu Prefecture to the west, Shiga Prefecture to the south and the Sea of Japan to the west. Parts of the coastal area of the town are within the borders of the Echizen-Kaga Kaigan Quasi-National Park.

Neighbouring municipalities 
Fukui Prefecture
Tsuruga
Echizen
Ikeda
Echizen (town)
Shiga Prefecture
Nagahama
Gifu Prefecture
Ibigawa

Climate
Minamiechizen has a Humid climate (Köppen Cfa) characterized by warm, wet summers and cold winters with heavy snowfall. Parts of the town are located within the extremely heavy snowfall area of Japan.

Demographics
Per Japanese census data, the population of Minamiechizen has declined over the past 50 years.

History
Minamiechizen is part of ancient Echizen Province. During the Edo period, the area was mostly part of the holdings of Fukui Domain and Nishio Domain under the Tokugawa shogunate. Following the Meiji restoration, and the establishment of the modern municipalities it was organised into part of Nanjō District in Fukui Prefecture. Minamiechizen was formed on 1 January 2005, by the merger of the two former towns of Imajō and Nanjō, and the former village of Kōno (all from Nanjō District).

Economy
The economy of Minamiechizen is mixed, with agriculture and commercial fishing prominent.

Education
Minamiechizen has four public elementary schools and there middle schools operated by the city government. The town does not have public high school.

Transportation

Railway
  JR West - Hokuriku Main Line

Highway

Local attractions
Echizen-Kaga Kaigan Quasi-National Park
Somayama Castle, National Historic Site

References

External links

 
Minamiechizen Tourism website 

 
Towns in Fukui Prefecture
Populated coastal places in Japan